is a maze chase arcade game released in April 1988 in Japan by Taito. The object of the game is to drive your vehicle around a maze in order to clear the maze of dots while avoiding enemies. The game consists of 32 mazes total plus boss fights (some optional, some not). The game was ported to the Famicom Disk System under the title Youmais the same year. It was included as part of the compilation Taito Legends 2 in 2006, marking its first official release in the west. It was also re-released as part of the Arcade Archives lineup on the PlayStation 4 and Nintendo Switch on November 18, 2021 worldwide.

Reception 
In Japan, Game Machine listed Raimais on their June 15, 1988 issue as being the eleventh most-successful table arcade unit of the month.

References

External links 
 Raimais at gaming.moe
 
 
 Raimais at StrategyWiki

1988 video games
Arcade video games
Famicom Disk System games
Maze games
Nintendo Switch games
PlayStation 2 games
PlayStation 4 games
Taito arcade games
Taito L System games
Video games featuring female protagonists
Video games developed in Japan
Hamster Corporation games